Macerata is a city and comune in central Italy, the county seat of the province of Macerata in the Marche region. It has a population of about 41,564.

History

The historical city centre is on a hill between the Chienti and Potenza rivers. It first consisted of the Picenes city named Ricina (Helvia Recina), then, after its romanization, Recina and Helvia Recina. After the destruction of Helvia Recina by the barbarians, the inhabitants took shelter in the hills and eventually began to rebuild the city, first on the top of the hills, before descending again later and expanding. The newly rebuilt town was Macerata. It became a municipality (or comune in Italian) in August 1138.

20th century
The comune of Urbisaglia was the location of an internment camp for Jews and refugees, and a prisoner-of-war camp (PG53, at Sforzacosta) during World War II.

21st century
According to Jason Horowitz of The New York Times, Macerata was initially welcoming to migrants coming from Africa, and in 2013 the town "won national recognition for its integration efforts". Horowitz stated that by 2018 Macerata residents had a more negative view of migrants. In February 2018, an Italian woman, Pamela Mastropietro, was found dead in a suitcase in Macerata, with her body in pieces; a Nigerian was arrested and accused of causing the death. This caused an increase in anti-migrant sentiment; later that month an Italian far-right extremist, Luca Traini, shot six black people in Macerata and wrapped himself in the Italian flag.

Geography

Subdivisions
The town counts several hamlets (frazioni) and localities: Acquesalate, Acquevive, Botonto San Giacomo, Botonto Sant'Isidoro, Cervare, Cimarella, Cincinelli, Consalvi, Corneto, Helvia Recina, Isola, Madonna del Monte, Montanello, Piediripa, Sforzacosta, Valle, Vallebona, Valteia, Villa Potenza.

Climate 
Typically hilly, the climate is both Mediterranean and continental. Balkanic and northwestern perturbations may cause snow. Middle seasons are variable, and late snowfall and frost may occur during April. October is neither warm nor very cold. Summer is rather sunny, and sometimes the thermometer reaches . Garbino is the cause, a hot wind from the hinterland. Summer thunderstorms are frequent in August during the evening, when the weather becomes quite unstable.

Government

Main sights 

In the central Piazza della Libertà is the Loggia dei Mercanti with two-tier arcades dating from the Renaissance. There are a number of striking palazzi, mostly along Corso Matteotti, including Palazzo dei Diamanti. Next to the Loggia dei Mercanti, Corso della Repubblica leads to Piazza Vittorio Veneto where, in the Palazzo Ricci, houses the city's modern art gallery. The nearby Palazzo Buonaccorsi houses the main civic art museum, as well as a Carriage Museum. The palace was built in 1700–1720 for Count Raimondo Buonaccorsi and his son Cardinal Simone Buonaccorsi using designs by Giovanni Battista Contini. The piano nobile is known for the Sala dell'Eneide (Hall of the Aeneid), decorated with frescoes depicting episodes of the Aeneid depicted by Rambaldi, Dardani, Solimena, and canvases by Garzi and Giovanni Gioseffo dal Sole. Among the museum's masterpieces is the Renaissance work of the Madonna and Child by Carlo Crivelli.

The Biblioteca Comunale Mozzi Borgetti, the main civic library of Macerata, founded in the 18th century, is housed in the former Jesuit seminary, located on Piazza Vittorio Veneto.

The University of Macerata was founded in 1290 and has about 13,000 students; Macerata also has an art school, two publishing houses (Liberilibri and Quodlibet), jazz clubs and the like.

Just north of the town, at the Villa Potenza, lie the remains of ancient Helvia Recina, a Roman settlement destroyed by the Visigoths.
 
Among the churches in the town are:
Macerata Cathedral: built in Neoclassical style in 1771–1790; it has the remains of a 15th-century Gothic bell tower. The interior was designed by Cosimo Morelli.
San Claudio al Chienti: Romanesque church south of the Town. Its unusual shape is due to one church being built on the remains of another. It was built during the 14th century as war reparation to Montolmo (today's Corridonia), which defeated Macerata in a bloody and long war. San Claudio al Chienti is very close to Macerata, but it has been a frazione of Corridonia since that time.
San Filippo Neri
San Giorgio
Santa Maria della Misericordia
Santo Stefano

Macerata Opera Festival 

In July and August the Sferisterio Opera Festival is held in the 2,500 seat Arena Sferisterio. It is a huge neoclassical arena erected in the 1820s as a stadium for a form of handball by the architect Ireneo Aleandri. The orchestra pit is so wide that musicians at each end cannot hear each other.

The first opera performed here was Giuseppe Verdi's Aida in 1921. It was promoted by the association "Società Cittadina" led by Count Pieralberto Conti. The arena was transformed into a real outdoor theatre with an enormous parabolic stage. The orchestra was placed immediately behind it and the seats were located around it. In the middle of the front sidewall a large door was built that allowed the entrance of the Egyptian conqueror. Posters were created by Verona's official Aida employee Plino Codognato and the painter Emilio Lazzari. The opera and its Triumphal March employed many people (in addition to about one thousand props and also different animals such as horses and camels). Francisca Solari interpreted Aida and Alessandro Dolci sang the great tenor role in the robes of Radames. The hospitality of Macerata grew quickly and new ways were developed to induce people to stay longer in the town, so the opera was repeated 17 times with more than seventy thousand attendees. The next year the opera La Gioconda was sung. Until 1927 no more shows were performed, at which time the famous tenor Beniamino Gigli sang a unique concert for the invalids of World War I.

From World War II until the 1960s, it was rare to have operas in the local "Bel Canto". In 1967, Carlo Perucci, a native of San Benedetto del Tronto (Marche), established the first stable local band with the song Circuito lirico delle Marche, so when he was in Macerata he asked the city hall to offer new performances. With enthusiasm the local administrators allowed him to offer new extraordinary contracts: Giuseppe Verdi's Otello (with Del Monaco and Protti), and Giacomo Puccini's Madama Butterfly (with Antonietta Stella and Nicola Ruggeri). Finally, on 3 August, the musical season began, and continues to today.

Overall the Sferisterio is very relevant, compared sometimes to Italy's famous Arena di Verona and Caracalla operas. During this period, about 28 years, when Carlo Perucci was artistic director, the "Sferisterio" Arena, because of its perfect acoustics, housed the most important international voices of bel canto. Ballets with Fracci and Nureyev were performed. The presentations of Bohème by Ken Russell in 1984 and Enrico Job's Don Giovanni were particularly memorable. Other outstanding shows were La traviata and Lucia di Lammermoor, with stage design by Czech scenographer Josef Svoboda, Hugo De Ana's Turandot and De Flò's Faust and Tosca. In the late nineties, led by Orazi as artistic director, the most important singers of the world performed in the Macerata Opera, performing in both the Sferisterio and the Lauro Rossi theaters: Luciano Pavarotti, Plácido Domingo, Montserrat Caballé, Marilyn Horne, Fiorenza Cossotto, Ruggero Raimondi, Mariella Devia, José Carreras, Katia Ricciarelli, Renato Bruson, and Raina Kabaivanska.

Since 1990, some operas have been performed in the 550-seat Teatro Lauro Rossi following extensive renovation, which was completed in 1989. Originally named the Teatro dei Condomini and built by Cosimo Morelli on a project by Antonio Bibiena in 1767, it opened in 1774 with Pasquale Anfossi's Olimpiade. In 1872, it was renamed after the musician Lauro Rossi who was born in the town.

This positive situation made the Sferisterio Opera a success. By 1992 the organization had won the "Franco Abbiati award of Italian musical Critics" three times. Other prestigious Italian lyric events reproduce the Sferisterio's events: Opera di Roma, Teatro Comunale di Bologna and La Scala di Milano.

2006 was the year of transformation led by the new artistic director Pier Luigi Pizzi. The summer event became a "Festival". He gave all of his 50 years of experience. Pizzi's career as the opera's director, designer, and dresser earned many awards. The season started with a dominant theme that marks all the shows and their sets. The parabolic stage was recovered, reviving the old atmosphere of the Handball Stadium. In that year, Mozart's 250th anniversary, the theme of "initiatory journey" opened with the Magic Flute by the Austrian musician. From that moment in every season the choice of operas was marked by a fil rouge theme, demonstrating the great intellectual vitality of opera: il Gioco dei Potenti in 2007 with Macbeth, Maria Stuarda, Norma and the gala dance with Roberto Bolle and Alessandra Ferri; "La seduzione" in 2008 when the two-time Oscar-winning citizen of Macerata, Dante Ferretti, was hired as director; L'inganno in 2009 with Don Giovanni and Madama Butterfly.

Macerata–Loreto pilgrimage 
Every year since 1978, a 27 km pilgrimage from Macerata to Loreto has taken place on the first Saturday of June after school has finished. Though it attracts believers from all over the world, those from neighbouring cities and regions are especially numerous. Its main purpose is to revive an old tradition of gratitude of students to Mary for the end of the school year. Each iteration, more pilgrims have taken part, their number having grown from just three hundred to sixty thousand pilgrims. Overnight, participants are led through the hills along a road traditionally held to be a Marian path. A rood donated by Pope John Paul II, who chaired at the Mass in 1993, heads the procession. The night march is diligently guided and accompanied by recitations of the Rosary, songs, testimonies, meditations on the Word of God and the teachings of the Pope.

Cuisine 
Macerata has a good array of restaurants, trattorias and pizzerias. Local specialities include vincisgrassi alla maceratese, a regional version of lasagna that differs from the usual in that the ragù contains a mix of pork, beef and lamb.

People  
Matteo Ricci, Jesuit and the first European to enter the Forbidden City in the Chinese capital, was born in Macerata in 1552. 
 Antonio Nebbia, cook, author of the recipe book Il cuoco maceratese in 1779.
 Basilio Basili, opera singer and composter was born in Macerata in 1804.
 Enrico Accorretti (1888-1978), admiral during World War II
 Giuseppe Tucci (1894–1984), scholar of oriental cultures, was born in Macerata. 
 Ivo Pannaggi, Futurist painter and Bauhaus architect, was born and died in Macerata (1901–81). A high school in town was dedicated in his name.
 Dante Ferretti (born 1943), production designer, was born in Macerata.
 Pietro Paolo Floriani (1585–1638), architect and military engineer was born in Macerata. 
 Camila Giorgi (born 1991), tennis player

Twin towns - sister cities
Macerata is twinned with:
 Weiden in der Oberpfalz, Germany, since 1963
 Issy-les-Moulineaux, France, since 1982
 Floriana, Malta, since 2007
 Kamëz, Albania, since 2010

Sources 
E.H. Ercoli. Sferisterio. Macerata, Associazione Arena Sferisterio, 2007
A. Adversi, D. Cecchi, L. Paci (a cura di). Storia di Macerata. Macerata, 1972
G. Capici (a cura di). Sphaeristerium. Roma, 1989
F. Torresi (a cura di). La città sul palcoscenico. Macerata, 1997

See also

Macerata railway station
S.S. Maceratese 1922
Volley Lube
Diocese of Macerata
Madonna di Macerata

References

External links 

Opera Festival
Matteo Ricci Institute
Macerata Musei
The Matteo Ricci Macerata Project: An Illustrated Guidebook to Macerata
Studenti Università Macerata – Macerata Students Network

 
Cities and towns in the Marche
Hilltowns in the Marche